is a Japanese professional golfer.

Kajikawa was born in Chiba Prefecture. After turning professional he would play on and off between the Japan Golf Tour and the Japan Challenge Tour. He has not yet won on the Japan Golf Tour but has three wins on the Challenge Tour: one in 2004 and two in 2005.

Professional wins (3)

Japan Challenge Tour wins (3)

External links

Japanese male golfers
Japan Golf Tour golfers
Sportspeople from Chiba Prefecture
1971 births
Living people